Edwards County is the name of several counties in the United States:

Edwards County, Illinois 
Edwards County, Kansas 
Edwards County, Texas